Kevin Mussen (born 8 October 1933 in Hilltown, County Down) was an Irish sportsperson.  He played Gaelic football with his local club Clonduff and was a member of the Down senior inter-county team from 1951 until 1962.  Mussen captained Down to the All-Ireland title in 1960.  It was the first time that Down won the title and the first time that the Sam Maguire Cup crossed the border to the North.

References

 

1933 births
Living people
Clonduff Gaelic footballers
Down inter-county Gaelic footballers
Ulster inter-provincial Gaelic footballers
All-Ireland-winning captains (football)
People from County Down